Papaipema baptisiae, known generally as the indigo stem borer or wild indigo borer moth, is a species of cutworm or dart moth in the family Noctuidae. It is found in North America.

The MONA or Hodges number for Papaipema baptisiae is 9485.

References

Further reading

External links

 

Papaipema
Articles created by Qbugbot
Moths described in 1902